Dr. David P. Weir House is a historic home located at Greensboro, Guilford County, North Carolina. It was built about 1846, and is a two-story, frame structure with Greek Revival and Italianate style design elements.  It has a low hip roof pierced by two interior chimneys and a one-story kitchen wing. The house was expanded in 1961 by created a large meeting space at the front of the house for the Greensboro Woman's Club.  The house may have been built from a plan provided by the well-known New York architect Alexander Jackson Davis.

It was listed on the National Register of Historic Places in 1984.

References

Houses on the National Register of Historic Places in North Carolina
Greek Revival houses in North Carolina
Italianate architecture in North Carolina
Houses completed in 1846
Houses in Greensboro, North Carolina
National Register of Historic Places in Guilford County, North Carolina